Roy Harper  was an English association football referee. Born in Sheffield, West Riding of Yorkshire, he officiated in the Football League from 1961 to 1969. He died on 5 May 1969 after collapsing while officiating a Fourth Division match between York City and Halifax Town at Bootham Crescent.

References

Year of birth missing
Sportspeople from Sheffield
1969 deaths
English football referees
English Football League referees